Munmu station is a railway station located in Munmu-ri, Sŏhŭng County, North Hwanghae province, North Korea. It is on located on the P'yŏngbu Line, which was formed from part of the Kyŏngŭi Line to accommodate the shift of the capital from Seoul to P'yŏngyang; though this line physically connects P'yŏngyang to Pusan via Dorasan, in operational reality it ends at Kaesŏng due to the Korean Demilitarized Zone.

History
The station, originally called Munmuri station, was opened  by the Chosen Government Railway on 1 December 1939.

References

Railway stations in North Korea
Buildings and structures in North Hwanghae Province
Railway stations opened in 1939
1939 establishments in Korea